Rancagua is a city and commune in central Chile and part of the Rancagua conurbation.

It was originally named Santa Cruz de Triana by Spanish colonists. In 2012, its population was 232,211. The main economic activities range from mining, tourism, agriculture, timber, food production and services to minor industrial activities. The city also serves as the administrative and legal center of the region.

Together with Machalí and Gultro, it forms the Rancagua conurbation. After Curicó, Talca and Concepción, it is one of the most important and densely populated cities of the south central zone of Chile.

History

Foundation period

The Rancagua Valley was occupied by the local Picunche. They fell briefly under the control of the Inca Empire in the 15th century. Its remains in structures can still be found near the city today. Through their civil engineering, the Inca accomplished expeditions to the south of their empire.

Rancagua was founded by Spanish explorer José Antonio Manso de Velasco, who founded several cities in the central area of Chile. The settlement was first called Villa Santa Cruz de Triana.

The city is notable in Chilean history as the scene of the Disaster of Rancagua of 1814, when Chilean forces fighting for independence from Spain were defeated. This marked the beginning of the period known as the Reconquista (Reconquest), an attempt by Spain to regain control of Chile.

Today

In recent years the city has become one of the most attractive cultural and tourist centers in the O'Higgins Region, largely because of the vineyards that have been developed in the area. Rancagua also offers sports centers and easy access to smaller villages and towns.

Other visitors are attracted to the archeological sites, such as Pukara de La Compañia and the nearby Rio Cipreses nature reserve. Both can be visited by private vehicle or with local tour companies.

The city is connected to the capital, Santiago, by the Panamerican Highway (Chile Route 5). In addition, the Metrotren connects the metro service in Santiago to Rancagua by train.

Rancagua is home of the  University of Rancagua (in Spanish), the first private university to be established in the O'Higgins Region.

The region is known for El Teniente in the nearby Andes mountain range: it is the "largest underground copper mine in the world." El Teniente is a division of the state-owned mining enterprise, Codelco.

The city's Braden Copper Stadium, named for the American company that developed the mine through the first half of the 20th century, was one of the four venues of the 1962 FIFA World Cup. More recently, it houses the O'Higgins professional football (soccer) club, one of the leading teams in Chilean professional football.  Every year, the National Championship of Chilean rodeo is held in the Medialuna Monumental de Rancagua. In 2015, the city hosted the 2015 Copa América, receiving two matches of the tournament.

Demographics

The population of Rancagua is primarily either of Spanish descent or mestizo, with a particularly strong Basque influence. There are also residents of German, Croatian, Italian, Greek, Levantine Arab, Swiss, French, English or Irish ancestry living in the city. Indigenous Mapuche workers migrate from the south and there are also some Roma gypsies.

In addition, there has been increasing immigration to the city from neighbouring South American countries such as Bolivia, Colombia and Peru. Of these, 206,971 (96.6%) lived in urban areas and 7,373 (3.4%) in rural areas. The population grew by 14.4% (27,020 persons) between the 1992 and 2002 censuses.

Notable people born in Rancagua

 Germán Riesco (1854–1916), President of Chile between 1901 and 1906.
 Lucho Gatica, bolero singer.
 Cristóbal González, footballer.
 José Victorino Lastarria (1817–1888), writer and politician.
 Mariano Díaz, photographer, graphic designer, and writer.
 Clarence Acuña, ex-footballer.
 Bryan Rabello, footballer.
 Mario Núñez, ex-footballer.
 Francisco Javier Quintanilla, theologian
 Ximena Cristi, painter

Administration
As a commune, Rancagua is a third-level administrative division of Chile, administered by a municipal council and headed by an alcalde, who is directly elected by the people for a four-year term.

Culture

This area is known as the "huaso province" after the name of the Chilean cowboy, the huaso. The population is a mixture of both European (including Argentine immigrants) and indigenous races and cultures. The region has a homogeneous culture known as Chileanidad and a mestizo influence is evident.

Rancagua and the Libertador General Bernardo O'Higgins Region was settled by Spaniards (notably Andalusian, Basque, Aragonese and Navarrese) and other Europeans. French and Italian families established agriculture, including the important wine industry: the Wine Route is one of the main tourist attractions of the Colchagua valley. Breweries can be found as well, the legacy of German and Swiss immigration. Livestock development and herding was especially influenced by British, Greek and Yugoslavian settlers.

Because the city is relatively close to Santiago, there has led to a growing urban influence in the local culture. Rancagua is fast becoming a suburb of Santiago's upper-class professional workforce.

Festivals

Transportation

Public Transport is provided by Trans O'Higgins by six lines of busses.

Mining - El Teniente 
Situated 44 km east of Rancagua and 75 km south of the capital, Santiago, El Teniente claims to be the largest underground copper mine in the world (see below). The El Teniente orebody has been known and worked on a small scale for many years. In the 16th century it became the property of the Jesuits as it was located on their Hacienda de la Compañia de Jesús. They operated a small mine known as the Socavón de los Jesuitas. Following their expulsion, the hacienda was acquired in 1768 by Don Mateo de Toro y Zambrano y Ureta. Between 1819 and 1823 his heirs restarted and enlarged the workings, bringing in a mining engineer to help. However, these and subsequent attempts to establish anything more than a small scale mine failed for lack of capital and the property was eventually bought by the American, William Braden, for approximately US$100,000. The same year Braden formed Rancagua Mines, which became the Braden Copper Company, in association with old colleagues from ASARCO, including Barton Sewell.

Work started on establishing a mine in 1905 after Government permission had been acquired but progress was slow because of difficulty of access and a hard winter climate. A small gravity plant was soon erected but it was not until 1912 that a flotation plant was erected at Sewell. Control passed to Kennecott in 1915 and it ran the mine until nationalization in 1971.

Climate
Rancagua has a Mediterranean climate (Köppen Csb), with clearly marked seasons. Summers are generally extremely dry, with cool mornings and hot afternoons, while winters are mild with cold mornings and occasional periods of heavy rainfall that averages around  each year – almost all of which occurs during a handful of storms between May and August. In some years there can be a little snow.

Sports

The sport in the city is varied including football, basketball and hockey. The city's most famous football club is O'Higgins, who currently plays in the first category of Chilean soccer, the Primera División de Chile. O'Higgins had great past glories, with the help of El Teniente they became one of the leading teams of Chile during the 1970s, participating on several occasions in the Copa Libertadores, their best performance being a semifinal appearance. In 2013, they won the Primera División de Chile for the first time, followed by a win in the Supercopa de Chile in 2014. Amongst other football clubs in the city are Tomás Greig and Enfoque, both of which play in the Tercera División de Chile.

Since 2015 the Autódromo Internacional de Codegua in the neighboring commune of Codegua held the Chile Grand Prix in the Superbike World Championship, the circuit was supposed to also host a race in the 2016 Grand Prix motorcycle racing season, although those plans were cancelled.

Stadiums and arenas
 Estadio El Teniente, host of the 1962 FIFA World Cup and 2015 Copa América.
 Medialuna Monumental de Rancagua, host the Campeonato Nacional de Rodeo and Davis Cup.
 Autódromo Internacional de Codegua. 
 Gimnasio Hermógenes Lizana
 Estadio Municipal de Rancagua
 Gimnasio Asociación de Básquetbol de Rancagua
 Estadio Guillermo Saavedra

Twin towns – sister cities

Rancagua is twinned with:
 Logroño, Spain
 Paju, South Korea
 San Francisco, Argentina

Gallery

See also
 O'Higgins F.C.
 Battle of Rancagua
 Medialuna de Rancagua
 Sewell, Chile
 Codelco

References

External links

  Municipality of Rancagua
  Official Newspaper`s City Website
  Non-Official Website of Rancagua`s Soccer Team

 
Communes of Chile
Capitals of Chilean regions
Capitals of Chilean provinces
Populated places established in 1743
Populated places in Cachapoal Province
1743 establishments in the Spanish Empire